Brook Hill South is a residential community in York County, Pennsylvania, United States. It is adjacent to but separate from the neighborhood of Brook Hill.

References

Populated places in York County, Pennsylvania